Mundo de Fieras (English title:World of Beasts) is a Venezuelan telenovela written by Ligia Lezama for Venevisión. The telenovela premiered on Venevisión on March 6, 1991 and ran for 239 episodes until March 4, 1992 where it achieved a significant amount of success in Venezuela. The telenovela was distributed internationally by Venevisión International.

Catherine Fulop and Jean Carlo Simancas starred as the main protagonists with Rosalinda Serfaty and Chelo Rodriguez as the main antagonists.

Synopsis 
Mundo de Fieras tells the story of the consequences of the irresponsible parenthood of Leoncio Palacios who abandoned his wife and young daughter in the countryside to run off with another woman, Miriam Palacios. Charito Flores, his daughter, develops into a young beautiful woman forced to live in an inhospitable world which molds her into a charming and aggressive survivor. Once her mother dies, Charito gets a job at Leoncio's house where he is gravely ill. Before dying, he asks Charito to forgive him for abandoning them many years ago. During this time, Charito falls in live with Jose Manuel Bustamante who awakens in her the deepest feelings. But he is married to  Joselyn Bustamante, a hysterical woman suffering from a  mental illness, who will strike violently when she discovers her husband's love for Charito.

Cast

Main 
Catherine Fulop as Charito Flores / Viviana
Jean Carlo Simancas as Jose Manuel Bustamante
Rosalinda Serfaty as Jocelyn Palacios Ansola de Sartori Bustamante
Luis José Santander as Ivan Soriano
Elluz Peraza as Indiana Castro / (Pociedad)
Miguel Alcantara as Silvio Ascanio
Chelo Rodriguez as Miriam de Palacios Ansola

Recurring 
Mirtha Borges as Chabela Soriano
Maria Elena Dominguez as Charo
Marisela Buitriago as Leonicia
Orangel Delfin as Leoncio
Diego Balaguer as Emilio / Clemente Sartori
Simón Pestana as Amadeo Bustamante
Ernesto Balzi as Federico
Carolina Lopez as Brigitte Perdigon
Lilibeth Morillo as Tamara "Tammi" Soriano
Marcelo Romo as Raymundo Camaro
Liliana Rodriguez as Chinca
Luis Gerardo Núñez as Valentín Velasco
Dulce María Pilonieta as Manuela "Chelita" Bustamante Perdigón
Gabriela Spanic

Remake
Mundo de Fieras was remade in Mexico by producer Salvador Mejia and starred Edith González, César Évora, Helena Rojo,  Gaby Espino.

References

External links

Opening Credits

1991 telenovelas
Venevisión telenovelas
Venezuelan telenovelas
1991 Venezuelan television series debuts
1992 Venezuelan television series endings
Spanish-language telenovelas
Television shows set in Caracas